The Loos Memorial is a World War I memorial forming the sides and rear of Dud Corner Cemetery, located near the commune of Loos-en-Gohelle, in the Pas-de-Calais département of France. The memorial lists 20,610 names of British and Commonwealth soldiers with no known grave who were killed in the area during and after the Battle of Loos, which started on 25 September 1915. This memorial covers the same sector of the front as the Le Touret Memorial, with each memorial commemorating the dead either side of the date of the start of the Battle of Loos.

Designed by Sir Herbert Baker, the sculptures were by Sir Charles Wheeler. The memorial was unveiled on 4 August 1930 by General Sir Nevil Macready. Macready served as Adjutant-General of the British Expeditionary Force (BEF) from the outbreak of the war to February 1916, and then served as Adjutant-General to the Forces until a few months before the end of the war in November 1918.

Notable commemoratees
Three posthumous Victoria Cross recipients are commemorated on this memorial under their respective regiments:

Lieutenant-Colonel Angus Douglas-Hamilton
Private George Peachment
Second Lieutenant Frank Wearne

Also commemorated on this memorial are:

Scots rugby international Second Lieutenant Walter Michael Dickson
English first-class cricketer Arthur Edwards.
England rugby international Second Lieutenant Douglas Lambert.
British Member of Parliament Second Lieutenant The Hon. Charles Thomas Mills.
poet Captain Charles Sorley
Wales rugby international Lieutenant-Colonel Richard Garnons Williams.

References

External links
Commonwealth War Graves Commission details of the Loos Memorial
Set of pictures of the cemetery and memorial
Description and some history of the cemetery and memorial

Commonwealth War Graves Commission memorials
World War I memorials in France
Buildings and structures completed in 1930
Monuments and memorials in the Pas-de-Calais
Herbert Baker buildings and structures